RFA Salvalour (A494) was a salvage ship of the Royal Fleet Auxiliary.

Salvalour was built by the Goole Shipbuilding & Repair Company, Goole, launched on 2 November 1944, and commissioned on 4 September 1945. The ship was decommissioned in October 1955 and laid up in reserve. She was sold into commercial service on 25 November 1971, and was scrapped in Pakistan in February 1978.

References

King Salvor-class salvage vessels
Ships built in Goole
1944 ships